Hee Loy Sian (born 18 June 1970) is a Malaysian politician who has served as Member of the Selangor State Executive Council (EXCO) in the Pakatan Harapan (PH) state administration under Menteris Besar Azmin Ali and Amirudin Shari since May 2018 as well as Member of the Selangor State Legislative Assembly (MLA) for Kajang since May 2018. He served as the Member of Parliament (MP) for Petaling Jaya Selatan from March 2008 to May 2018. He is a member of the People's Justice Party (PKR), a component party of the PH coalition. 

Hee was elected to Parliament in the 2008 election, winning the seat of Petaling Jaya Selatan from Deputy Tourism Minister Donald Lim Siang Chai of the Barisan Nasional coalition. He was reelected again in the 2013 election. In the 2018 election, Hee contested and won the Kajang state seat in Selangor.

Election results

See also
Petaling Jaya Selatan (federal constituency)
Kajang (state constituency)

References

1970 births
Living people
People from Perak
Malaysian politicians of Chinese descent
People's Justice Party (Malaysia) politicians
Members of the Dewan Rakyat
Members of the Selangor State Legislative Assembly
Selangor state executive councillors
21st-century Malaysian politicians
University of Malaya alumni